Phytophthora bilorbang is a non-papillate homothallic plant pathogen known to infect Rubus anglocandicans (European blackberry) in Western Australia. It produces non-papillate sporangia, oogonia with smooth walls containing thick-walled oospores, as well as paragynous antheridia.

References

Further reading
Aghighi, Sonia, et al. "Blackberry decline: a major disease of Rubus anglocandicans in south-west Australia." (2012): 146–149.
Parke, Jennifer L., et al. "Phytophthora community structure analyses in Oregon nurseries inform systems approaches to disease management."Phytopathology 104.10 (2014): 1052-1062.
Aghighi, S., et al. "Phytophthora bilorbang prov. nom., a new species associated with declining Rubus anglocandicans (blackberry) in Western Australia." (2012).

bilorbang
Water mould plant pathogens and diseases
Tree diseases
Protists described in 2012